Good Pages is the series of retrospective album by a Japanese singer-songwriter Yōsui Inoue. 

The primary edition of Good Pages mainly comprises the songs which appeared on two studio albums: Danzetsu and its follow-up Yosui Two: Sentimental, which came out before he made a breakthrough with his 1973 effort Kori no Sekai. This compilation also includes hit singles such as "Yamiyo no Kuni kara", and "Yume no Naka e" along with its flip side "Itsunomanika Shoujo wa". It was initially issued on vinyl only and remained 45 weeks on the Japanese Oricon charts, spending 3 consecutive weeks at number-one. 

In October 1975, an audio cassette version entitled Best Pages came out. The contents were different from the original edition, and the order of the track list was chronological.

Track listing (1975 release)

All songs written and composed by Yōsui Inoue, arranged by Katz Hoshi (except "Tsumetai Heya no Sekai Chizu" co-arranged by Kousuke Onozaki, "Adokenai Kimi no Shigusa" arranged by Inoue)

Side one
""
""
""
""
""
""

Side two
""
""
""
""
""
""

Track listing (1975 cassette edition entitled Best Pages)

Side-A
""
""
""
""
""
""
""
""
""

Side-B
""
""
""
""
""
"" (Inoue/Kei Ogura)
""
""
""
""
""

Chart positions

References

Yōsui Inoue albums
1975 compilation albums